The Rubatab people constitute one of many Sunni Arab riverine tribes of Northern Sudan. They inhabit the region of the Fourth Cataract of the Nile. Similar to their neighbouring tribes, the mid-stream Manasir  and the downstream Shaiqiyah (الشايقيّة), the Rubatab are an Arab tribe in the Northeastern Sudan, with an archaic Arabic mother tongue. Their tribal homeland traditionally stretches north of Berber, Sudan until the famed town of Abu Hamad. The Rubatab border the Ababda people, the Bishari tribe, and the Manasir.

Culture

Communication
The Rubatab people speak Arabic. Their accent is different from other tribes in Sudan, but the language is the same, including the alphabets. People from other tribes may have difficulty understanding them because of their distinct accent.

People in Rubatab show respect for each other, even when it comes to greeting one another. They usually shake hands and put the right hand on the other person’s shoulder (for men) saying "salaam aleikum" and the other answers by saying "wa aleikumu salaam". Women show respect for each other by shaking hands, hugging or kissing each other on each cheek. People in the tribe have traditional Islamic names, like Mohammed and Ahmed.

Art forms
The Rubatab people have a distinct dance style from other tribes. Weddings are the only occasions where men dance with women. The people generally prefer painting rather than crafting. Many people are farmers, and few are artists. A notable exception is Mohammed Sadiq, a famous comedian and actor.

The music is simple, the instruments are homemade. Women play drums and men play tambour. Men and women have their own distinct drums.

In local architecture, many one-story buildings are made with bricks and cement. Each home has two doors, one for men and one for women.

The dress style is similar to the northern Sudanese people. Women wear toub that are one piece of generally a brightly colored cloth wrapped around the entire body and covering the hair. Underneath women wear dresses which are worn without the toub indoors. Men wear jalabiya, a traditional white full-length, long-sleeved gown with white trousers underneath. Wealthy Rubatab women wear jewellery to show their riches. Also, there is heavy emphasis on beauty in the eyes and women emphasize their eyes with eyeliner.

Social behavior
The people of the Rubatab tribe play many different games. Girls play a game called "Higla". In this game, they draw a circle on the floor and throw rocks inside the circle and jump. Males play soccer and a game with rocks and sticks. They usually play these games after school or during break times.

The Rubatab people follow Islamic holidays. They have many traditional foods. One is called asida (porridge in English), made from sorghum, and they eat it with a tomato sauce. Another dish is called gorassa, which looks like pancake, and it is eaten with tomato sauce. They have three meals each day, breakfast is at 10 a.m., lunch is at 3 p.m. and dinner (optional) is at 10 p.m.

By tradition, when a child is born, the mother is not allowed to go out until 40 days after the birth. She stays at home with some relatives and friends. People come and give the mother money. On the seventh day after birth the child is officially named. A sheep or a cow is killed for a feast to celebrate this event. The size of the feast and the type of animal depends on the family's wealth. After 40 days have passed, there is another party, and the mother is free to leave the home.

When someone dies, people call everyone from their family and all the family members come to the house. If the father dies, people close the room and wash the dead body. They wash the whole body with water, and afterwards they would put perfume on the body, and wrap it in white cloth. They put the body on a bed, and the body is then taken to the grave where it is buried according to Islamic procedures. When a husband dies, the wife wears white, and she stays in her home for four months and ten days. She is not supposed to put on any makeup as a sign of respect to the deceased.

Social structure

Roles of women and girls
Women are responsible for the house and children. Women stay at home and raise the children. Girls usually stay at home and help their mothers to cook or do other tasks. Girls are allowed to go to school and work. Although generally expected to be in the home, they can have any job they want and are also allowed to finish school. In the past, girls were not allowed to go to school. Some believe it was not safe to send girls to school, but now girls have a right to go to school.

Roles of men and boys
Men work to feed their family. They also must make decisions with their wives. They often sit outside separately from women during times of leisure talk or play cards. Boys have more freedom and will play outside or spend time with the men. Some families follow these general rules and others do not.

Many in the tribe believe that boys and men are more important than girls. They generally have a higher status, and people prefer having sons to daughters.

Roles of young people
Teenagers have to respect the elders and must follow general social rules about interaction depending on their family's perception of these traditional rules. Girls must respect boys and act like ladies by paying attention to how they dress and act. Boys are expected to act strong and emulate men. Boys must respect traditional rules about decency, which include not touching women.

Roles of elders
Old people are respected and honored by others in society. Elders teach children how to respect other people and punish those who do not follow directions.

People and how they are important
Rubatab people honor those who are generous with them.

Choosing a spouse
In the past, the groom would introduce himself to the spouses family and ask for her hand in marriage The groom would introduce himself and say why he wants to marry the woman and if he is accepted by her family they will give him her hand in marriage. He would tell about himself, giving details to the family. The girl’s family would go and ask others in the community about the potential groom's character and reputation. Assuming all information gathered is favorable, he brings his family to introduce them to the other family. Men greet and socialize with the men and women with the women. Women bring gifts.

Institutions

Family
Most families in Rubatab give their son a house when he is ready to get married. The leader of the family is always the father. Mothers help make decision with the father, but the father is always the final decision. While some families follow traditional rules that show favoritism to boys, more recently some families treat girls more equally to boys.

Religion
The Rubatab people believe in Islam. Rubatab people trace their ancestry to Arabia. There is mutual respect for other tribes that believe in other religions. They are no other religions in the Rubatab tribe.

Government
Decisions are made by men mostly, but women do have rights if they treated fairly. Solutions are discussed and then put to a vote for a final decision. Meetings amongst decision-makers happen in safe place set aside for meetings. Meetings are often called by people in the government.

Rules
The rules in the group are respecting each other and treating people fairly. In the past, marriage outside the tribe was forbidden for both women and men.

Education
Girls and boys go to school. In some schools, girls sit separately from boys. There are girls' schools and boys' schools. The teachers are both male and female, but in high school usually women are the teachers. Subjects taught are mathematics, science and language, but the largest focus is on religion.

Economic base

Jobs are similar to the world, such as engineering. Wealthy persons buy luxury cars and live in quality houses. Some people are self-employed. In the past people weren't allowed to trade anything to the other group, but the rules changed, and now some people do.

Notable members
Dr. Mekki Shibeika, The first Sudanese who earned a Ph.D ever in 1949 from the University of London, and first Sudanese to be dean of College of Arts, University of Khartoum, 1955, historian, and the father of the modern Sudanese history.
Dr. Ali Shibeika, poet, and pharmacist.

Sahikh Babiker Badri, the father of modern women education in Sudan, and founder of the first girls school in Rufaa, Sudan, 1907. Founder of Ahfad schools. 
 Shaikh Mohamed Shibeika, a relative of Shaikh Babiker Badri and one of his first students. educator, and a pioneer in education. Founder of Al- Nahda'a Middle School, Omdurman .
Zeinab Badawi, Journalist

Ayoub Siddig, BBC Worldwide Service broadcaster

References

Arabs in Sudan
Ethnic groups in Sudan